The following is a list of state highways in Kentucky with numbers between 2000 and 2999.

2000-2099
 KY 2000
 KY 2001
 KY 2002
 KY 2003
 KY 2004
 KY 2005
 KY 2006
 KY 2007
 KY 2008
 KY 2009
 KY 2010
 KY 2011
 KY 2012
 KY 2013
 KY 2014
 KY 2015
 KY 2016
 KY 2017
 KY 2018
 KY 2019
 KY 2020
 KY 2021
 KY 2022
 KY 2023 (removed 2018)
 KY 2024
 KY 2025
 KY 2026
 KY 2027
 KY 2028
 KY 2029
 KY 2030
 KY 2031
 KY 2032
 KY 2033
 KY 2034
 KY 2035
 KY 2036
 KY 2037
 KY 2038
 KY 2039
 KY 2040
 KY 2041
 KY 2042
 KY 2043
 KY 2044
 KY 2045
 KY 2046
 KY 2047
 KY 2048
 KY 2049
 KY 2050
 KY 2051
 KY 2052
 KY 2053
 KY 2054
 KY 2055
 KY 2056
 KY 2057
 KY 2058
 KY 2059
 KY 2060 (removed 1992)
 KY 2061
 KY 2062
 KY 2063
 KY 2064
 KY 2065
 KY 2066
 KY 2067
 KY 2068
 KY 2069
 KY 2070
 KY 2071
 KY 2072 (removed 2012)
 KY 2073
 KY 2074 (removed 2022)
 KY 2075
 KY 2076
 KY 2077
 KY 2078
 KY 2079
 KY 2080
 KY 2081
 KY 2082
 KY 2083
 KY 2084
 KY 2085 (removed 2011)
 KY 2086 (removed 2002)
 KY 2087
 KY 2088 (removed 1997)
 KY 2089
 KY 2090
 KY 2091
 KY 2092 (removed 1996)
 KY 2093 (removed 1987)
 KY 2094
 KY 2095
 KY 2096
 KY 2097
 KY 2098
 KY 2099

2100-2199
 KY 2100 (removed 1990)
 KY 2101
 KY 2102
 KY 2103
 KY 2104 (removed 2001)
 KY 2105 (removed 2001)
 KY 2106
 KY 2107- from US 431 / KY 70 in Drakesboro to US 431 / KY 70 near Central City
 KY 2108
 KY 2109
 KY 2110
 KY 2111 (removed 1991)
 KY 2112 (removed 2001)
 KY 2113
 KY 2114 (removed 2003)
 KY 2115
 KY 2116
 KY 2117
 KY 2118
 KY 2119 (removed 2000)
 KY 2120
 KY 2121
 KY 2122
 KY 2123
 KY 2124
 KY 2125 (removed 2006)
 KY 2126 (removed 2004)
 KY 2127
 KY 2128- from TN 238 at the Tennessee state line to US 79 / KY 181 in Guthrie
 KY 2129 KY 2130 (removed 1986) KY 2131 (removed 1986)
 KY 2131- from KY 740 near Coral Hill to KY 70 near Halfway (established 1994)
 KY 2132
 KY 2133
 KY 2134
 KY 2135 KY 2136 (removed 1995) KY 2137 (removed 1992)
 KY 2138
 KY 2139
 KY 2140 KY 2141 (removed 1986)
 KY 2141 KY 2142 (removed 1993) KY 2143 (removed 1986)
 KY 2143- from US 31E near Cave City to KY 685 near Cave City (established 1994) KY 2144 (removed 1992)
 KY 2145
 KY 2146 KY 2147 (removed 1992) KY 2148 (removed 1986)
 KY 2149
 KY 2150
 KY 2151
 KY 2152
 KY 2153
 KY 2154 KY 2155 (removed 1991)
 KY 2155- from US 60 / US 231 in Owensboro to KY 2262 in Owensboro (established 2002)
 KY 2156
 KY 2157
 KY 2158- from US 231 in Bowling Green to KY 234 near Bowling Green KY 2159 (removed 1992)
 KY 2160
 KY 2161- Spur from US 231 in Morgantown
 KY 2162- from KY 70 / KY 403 in Morgantown to KY 2161 in Morgantown
 KY 2163
 KY 2164
 KY 2165
 KY 2166
 KY 2167
 KY 2168- from US 127 near Danville to KY 34 in Danville
 KY 2169
 KY 2170
 KY 2171
 KY 2172 KY 2173 (removed 2005) KY 2174 (removed 1992)
 KY 2175 KY 2176 (removed 1992) KY 2177 (removed 1992) KY 2178 (removed 1992)
 KY 2179 KY 2180 (removed 2002) KY 2181 (removed 2020)
 KY 2182- from KY 70 / KY 259 in Brownsville to KY 2184 in Brownsville
 KY 2183
 KY 2184- Loop from KY 70 / KY 259 in Brownsville
 KY 2185
 KY 2186
 KY 2187 KY 2188 (removed 1984)
 KY 2189- US 68 / KY 80 near Glasgow to US 31W in Park City (established 1987) KY 2190 (removed 1984)
 KY 2191
 KY 2192
 KY 2193
 KY 2194
 KY 2195- KY 70 in Cave City to US 31E at Bear Wallow (established 1987) KY 2196 (removed 1995) KY 2197 (removed 1988)
 KY 2198
 KY 2199

2200-2299 KY 2200 (removed 1994)
 KY 2201
 KY 2202 KY 2203 (removed 1988)
 KY 2204
 KY 2205
 KY 2206
 KY 2207
 KY 2208
 KY 2209 KY 2210 (removed 1996)
 KY 2211
 KY 2212
 KY 2213 KY 2214 (removed 1998) KY 2215 (removed 1980)
 KY 2216
 KY 2217 KY 2218 (removed 1999) KY 2219 (removed 1986) KY 2220 (removed 1999) KY 2221 (removed 1986)
 KY 2222 KY 2223 (removed 1986)
 KY 2224
 KY 2225
 KY 2226
 KY 2227
 KY 2228 KY 2229 (removed 1999)
 KY 2230 KY 2231 (removed 1987)
 KY 2232 KY 2233 (removed 1993)
 KY 2234 KY 2235 (removed 2011) KY 2236 (removed 1988)
 KY 2237
 KY 2238
 KY 2239
 KY 2240- KY 1297 at Railton to US 68 / KY 80 at Merry Oaks (established 1987)
 KY 2241
 KY 2242
 KY 2243 KY 2244 (removed 1997)
 KY 2245 KY 2246 (removed 1984)
 KY 2247
 KY 2248
 KY 2249
 KY 2250
 KY 2251 KY 2252 (removed 1997)
 KY 2253 KY 2254 (removed 1984) KY 2255 (removed 1984)
 KY 2256- from KY 1472 at Graefenburg to US 60 at Graefenburg KY 2257 (removed 1984)
 KY 2258- Spur from KY 53 near Shelbyville
 KY 2259- Spur from US 60 in Frankfort KY 2260 (removed 2018)
 KY 2261
 KY 2262- from KY 54 in Owensboro to IN 161 at the Owensboro Bridge over the Ohio River (established 2011) KY 2263- KY 70 in Rochester to KY 393 in Rochester (established 1987, removed 2018) KY 2264 (removed 1992)
 KY 2265- Spur from KY 155 in Louisville
 KY 2266- Spur from KY 70 at Jetson (established 1987)
 KY 2267- from KY 1153 at Leetown to KY 70 at Dunbar (established 1987)
 KY 2268- Spur from KY 43 and KY 55 Bus. near Shelbyville (established 1992)
 KY 2269- from KY 1118 at Gilstrap to KY 2713 at Dexterville (established 1987)
 KY 2270- from KY 973 near Rosewood to KY 70 at Ennis
 KY 2271
 KY 2272
 KY 2273
 KY 2274
 KY 2275
 KY 2276
 KY 2277
 KY 2278 KY 2279 (removed 1990)
 KY 2280
 KY 2281
 KY 2282
 KY 2283
 KY 2284 KY 2285 (removed 2001) KY 2286 (removed 2001)
 KY 2287
 KY 2288
 KY 2289
 KY 2290
 KY 2291
 KY 2292
 KY 2293
 KY 2294
 KY 2295
 KY 2296
 KY 2297- from US 27 in Somerset to KY 2292 in Somerset
 KY 2298
 KY 2299

2300-2399
 KY 2300
 KY 2301 KY 2302 (removed 2007)
 KY 2303
 KY 2304 KY 2305 (removed 1984) KY 2306 (removed 1984) KY 2307 (removed 1984)
 KY 2308
 KY 2309
 KY 2310
 KY 2311
 KY 2312- Loop from KY 70 Bus. in Liberty
 KY 2313- from US 127 in Liberty to KY 70 Bus. in Liberty
 KY 2314 KY 2315 (removed 1994) KY 2316 (removed 1994)
 KY 2317
 KY 2318
 KY 2319
 KY 2320 KY 2321 (removed 2010) KY 2322 (removed 2011)
 KY 2323
 KY 2324
 KY 2325- from KY 259 near Pig to KY 70 near Arthur (established 1987)
 KY 2326- from US 31W near Tuckertown to KY 743 near Chalybeate (established 1987)
 KY 2327
 KY 2328- from US 25 / US 421 near Lexington to I-75 / US 25 / US 421 in Lexington
 KY 2329
 KY 2330- from KY 187 near Sunfish to KY 1075 near Sunfish (established 1987)
 KY 2331
 KY 2332
 KY 2333- from KY 321 Bus. in Paintsville to KY 1428 in Paintsville (established 1996) KY 2334 (removed 1989)
 KY 2335
 KY 2336- from KY 728 near Oak Ridge to KY 259 in Broadway (established 1987)
 KY 2337
 KY 2338
 KY 2339 KY 2340 (removed 2011) KY 2341 (removed 1995)
 KY 2342 KY 2343 (removed 1995)
 KY 2344
 KY 2345
 KY 2346
 KY 2347
 KY 2348
 KY 2349
 KY 2350 KY 2351 (removed 2005)
 KY 2352 KY 2353 (removed 2010)
 KY 2354- from KY 22 in Owenton to US 127 / KY 227 in Owenton KY 2355 (removed 2014) KY 2356 (removed 1999) KY 2357 (removed 2014) KY 2358 (removed 2014) KY 2359 (removed 1998) KY 2360 (removed 1994) KY 2361 (removed 1998)
 KY 2362
 KY 2363 KY 2364 (removed 1993) KY 2365 (removed 1986) KY 2366 (removed 2011) KY 2367 (removed 1993) KY 2368 (removed 2010)
 KY 2369
 KY 2370
 KY 2371
 KY 2372
 KY 2373 KY 2374 (removed 2018)
 KY 2375
 KY 2376
 KY 2377- from KY 106 near Sand Spring to KY 79 near Pauline (established 1987)
 KY 2378- Spur from KY 321 in Paintsville
 KY 2379 KY 2380 (removed 2017)
 KY 2381
 KY 2382
 KY 2383
 KY 2384
 KY 2385
 KY 2386- from KY 92 in Williamsburg to KY 296 in Williamsburg
 KY 2387
 KY 2388
 KY 2389
 KY 2390
 KY 2391
 KY 2392
 KY 2393
 KY 2394
 KY 2395
 KY 2396 KY 2397 (removed 1990)
 KY 2398
 KY 2399

2400-2499 KY 2400 (removed 1989)
 KY 2401
 KY 2402 KY 2403 (removed 1989) KY 2404 (removed 1995)
 KY 2405 (established 2018)
 KY 2406 KY 2407 (removed 1989)
 KY 2408
 KY 2409 KY 2410 (removed 1980)
 KY 2411 KY 2412 (removed 1985)
 KY 2413
 KY 2414
 KY 2415 KY 2416 (removed 1980)
 KY 2417
 KY 2418
 KY 2419
 KY 2420
 KY 2421
 KY 2422
 KY 2423 KY 2424 (removed 2022)
 KY 2425
 KY 2426
 KY 2427
 KY 2428
 KY 2429
 KY 2430
 KY 2431
 KY 2432
 KY 2433 KY 2434 (removed 1991)
 KY 2435
 KY 2436 KY 2437 (removed 2017)
 KY 2438
 KY 2439
 KY 2440
 KY 2441
 KY 2442
 KY 2443
 KY 2444 KY 2445 (removed 2012)
 KY 2446
 KY 2447
 KY 2448 KY 2449 (removed 2012)
 KY 2450 KY 2451 (removed 2012)
 KY 2452
 KY 2453
 KY 2454
 KY 2455 KY 2456 (removed 2001) KY 2457 (removed 2001) KY 2458 (removed 2001)
 KY 2459
 KY 2460
 KY 2461 KY 2462 (removed 2022) KY 2463 (removed 1996) KY 2464 (removed 1996) KY 2465 (removed 1987)
 KY 2466
 KY 2467
 KY 2468
 KY 2469 KY 2470 (removed 1987) KY 2471 (removed 2022)
 KY 2472 KY 2473 (removed 2001) KY 2474 (removed 1996) KY 2475 (removed 1996)
 KY 2476 KY 2477 (removed 1996) KY 2478 (removed 1996)
 KY 2479
 KY 2480
 KY 2481 KY 2482 (removed 1996)
 KY 2483 KY 2484 (removed 1996) KY 2485 (removed 1984)
 KY 2486
 KY 2487 KY 2488 (removed 2020)
 KY 2489 KY 2490 (removed 2020)
 KY 2491 KY 2492 (removed 2020) KY 2493 (removed 2016)
 KY 2494
 KY 2495
 KY 2496
 KY 2497
 KY 2498
 KY 2499

2500-2599 KY 2500 (removed 2012)
 KY 2501
 KY 2502- Spur from KY 32 / KY 36 in Carlisle
 KY 2503
 KY 2504
 KY 2505
 KY 2506
 KY 2507
 KY 2508
 KY 2509
 KY 2510 KY 2511 (removed 2005) KY 2512 (removed 1987)
 KY 2513
 KY 2514
 KY 2515
 KY 2516
 KY 2517 KY 2518 (removed 2014)
 KY 2519
 KY 2520 KY 2521 (removed 2010)
 KY 2522
 KY 2523 KY 2524 (removed 1995) KY 2525 (removed 2013)
 KY 2526- Loop from KY 7 / KY 32 in Sandy Hook
 KY 2527 KY 2528 (removed 2018)
 KY 2529 KY 2530 (removed 1995)
 KY 2531
 KY 2532
 KY 2533
 KY 2534
 KY 2535
 KY 2536
 KY 2537
 KY 2538 KY 2539 (removed 2001)
 KY 2540
 KY 2541
 KY 2542
 KY 2543
 KY 2544
 KY 2545
 KY 2546 KY 2547 (removed 1989)
 KY 2548
 KY 2549
 KY 2550
 KY 2551
 KY 2552
 KY 2553
 KY 2554
 KY 2555 KY 2556 (removed 2002)
 KY 2557
 KY 2558
 KY 2559
 KY 2560
 KY 2561
 KY 2562
 KY 2563 KY 2564 (removed 1990)
 KY 2565
 KY 2566
 KY 2567
 KY 2568
 KY 2569
 KY 2570
 KY 2571 KY 2572 (removed 2002) KY 2573 (removed 2002) KY 2574 (removed 2002) KY 2575 (removed 2002) KY 2576 (removed 1980) KY 2577 (removed 2002) KY 2578 (removed 2002) KY 2579 (removed 2002) KY 2580 (removed 2002) KY 2581 (removed 2002) KY 2582 (removed 2002) KY 2583 (removed 2002)
 KY 2584 KY 2585 (removed 2002) KY 2586 (removed 2002) KY 2587 (removed 2002)
 KY 2588 KY 2589 (removed 2002)
 KY 2590 KY 2591 (removed 2016)
 KY 2592
 KY 2593
 KY 2594
 KY 2595
 KY 2596
 KY 2597
 KY 2598
 KY 2599

2600-2699 KY 2600 (removed 2002)
 KY 2601
 KY 2602
 KY 2603
 KY 2604
 KY 2605
 KY 2606
 KY 2607
 KY 2608
 KY 2609
 KY 2610
 KY 2611
 KY 2612
 KY 2613
 KY 2614 KY 2615 (removed 1991) KY 2616 (removed 1991)
 KY 2617
 KY 2618
 KY 2619
 KY 2620
 KY 2621 KY 2622 (removed 1991) KY 2623 (removed 1989) KY 2624 (removed 1989) KY 2625 (removed 1989) KY 2626 (removed 1989)
 KY 2627
 KY 2628
 KY 2629- KY 961 at Alvaton to KY 2158 in Bowling Green (established 1987)
 KY 2630
 KY 2631- KY 263 near Benleo to KY 263 near Richardsville (established 1987)
 KY 2632 KY 2633 (removed 1989) KY 2634 (removed 1986) KY 2635 (removed 1987) KY 2636 (removed 2006) KY 2637 (removed 2006) KY 2638 (removed 2006) KY 2639 (removed 2006) KY 2640 (removed 2006) KY 2641 (removed 2006) KY 2642 (removed 2006) KY 2643 (removed 1990) KY 2644 (removed 2011) KY 2645 (removed 2011) KY 2646 (removed 2011)
 KY 2647
 KY 2648 KY 2649 (removed 2011)
 KY 2650
 KY 2651
 KY 2652 KY 2653 (removed 2011) KY 2654 (removed 1997)
 KY 2655 KY 2656 (removed 2011)
 KY 2657 KY 2658 (removed 2004) KY 2659 (removed 1989)
 KY 2660 KY 2661 (removed 2000)
 KY 2662
 KY 2663
 KY 2664
 KY 2665- KY 1435 at Barren River to Main Avenue in Bowling Green (established 1987)
 KY 2666
 KY 2667
 KY 2668 KY 2669 (removed 1991)
 KY 2670 - From US 62 in near Beaver Dam to KY 1245 in McHenry
 KY 2671
 KY 2672
 KY 2673
 KY 2674
 KY 2675 KY 2676 (removed 2011)
 KY 2677
 KY 2678 KY 2679 (removed 2002) KY 2680 (removed 2011)
 KY 2681
 KY 2682 KY 2683 (removed 1991) KY 2684 (removed 1991)
 KY 2685
 KY 2686
 KY 2687 KY 2688 (removed 1990) KY 2689 (removed 2001)
 KY 2690
 KY 2691
 KY 2692
 KY 2693
 KY 2694
 KY 2695
 KY 2696
 KY 2697
 KY 2698
 KY 2699

2700-2799 KY 2700 (removed 2005) KY 2701 (removed 2005) KY 2702 (removed 2004) KY 2703 (removed 2004) KY 2704 (removed 1988) KY 2705 (removed 1994)
 KY 2706
 KY 2707
 KY 2708 KY 2709 (removed 2005) KY 2710 (removed 1985) KY 2711 (removed 2020)
 KY 2712
 KY 2713- KY 79 near Welcome to KY 505 at Windy Hill
 KY 2714 - from KY 369 to a dead end near Beaver Dam. KY 2715 (removed 2002) KY 2716 (removed 2014) KY 2717 (removed 2014)
 KY 2718 KY 2719- Spur from KY 1245 at Echols (removed 2020)
 KY 2720 KY 2721 (removed 1984)
 KY 2722
 KY 2723
 KY 2724 KY 2725 (removed 1995)
 KY 2726
 KY 2727 KY 2728 (removed 1983) KY 2729 (removed 1995) KY 2730 (removed 1995)
 KY 2731 KY 2732 (removed 1995) KY 2733 (removed 1995)
 KY 2734
 KY 2735 KY 2736 (removed 2001)
 KY 2737
 KY 2738
 KY 2739
 KY 2740
 KY 2741 KY 2742 (removed 1995) KY 2743 (removed 1985)
 KY 2744 KY 2745 (removed 1985)
 KY 2746 KY 2747 (removed 2012) KY 2748 (removed 1985) KY 2749 (removed 1988)
 KY 2750 KY 2751 (removed 1985) KY 2752 (removed 1985) KY 2753 (removed 1985)
 KY 2754 KY 2755 (removed 1985)
 KY 2756 KY 2757 (removed 1993)
 KY 2758
 KY 2759
 KY 2760
 KY 2761
 KY 2762
 KY 2763
 KY 2764
 KY 2765
 KY 2766
 KY 2767
 KY 2768 KY 2769 (removed 2000) KY 2770 (removed 2000) KY 2771 (removed 1993) KY 2772 (removed 1993) KY 2773 (removed 2012) KY 2774 (removed 1993)
 KY 2775 KY 2776 (removed 1993)
 KY 2777
 KY 2778
 KY 2779
 KY 2780
 KY 2781 KY 2782 (removed 1990) KY 2783 (removed 2000)
 KY 2784
 KY 2785
 KY 2786 KY 2787 (removed 1991) KY 2788 (removed 1991) KY 2789 (removed 1991) KY 2790 (removed 1991) KY 2791 (removed 1991)
 KY 2792
 KY 2793 KY 2794 (removed 1991) KY 2795 (removed 1991) KY 2796 (removed 1991) KY 2797 (removed 1991) KY 2798 (removed 1987) KY 2799 (removed 1991)

2800-2899
 KY 2800
 KY 2801- Frontage roads at I-264–KY 1020 interchange in Louisville
 KY 2802
 KY 2803- KY 61 in Louisville to I-65–Warnock Street interchange in Louisville
 KY 2804 KY 2805 (removed 1984) KY 2806 (removed 1984) KY 2807 (removed 1984) KY 2808 (removed 1984)
 KY 2809- Spur from KY 22 in Louisville KY 2810 (removed 2006) KY 2811 (removed 2006) KY 2812 (removed 1993) KY 2813 (removed 1984)
 KY 2814
 KY 2815 KY 2816 (removed 1984)
 KY 2817 KY 2818 (removed 1984) KY 2819 (removed 1984)
 KY 2820
 KY 2821
 KY 2822 KY 2823 (removed 1984) KY 2824 (removed 1984) KY 2825 (removed 1984) KY 2826 (removed 1984)
 KY 2827
 KY 2828 KY 2829 (removed 1984)
 KY 2830- KY 144 in Owensboro to KY 304 in Maceo (established 1998)
 KY 2831- US 60 / US 431 in Owensboro to KY 2245 in Owensboro (established 2010) KY 2832 (removed 1984) KY 2833 (removed 1984)
 KY 2834
 KY 2835
 KY 2836
 KY 2837
 KY 2838
 KY 2839
 KY 2840- KY 913 in Douglass Hills to Main Street in Middletown (established 1987)
 KY 2841- Loop from US 60 in Louisville (established 1987)
 KY 2842 KY 2843 (removed 1999) KY 2844 (removed 1998)
 KY 2845
 KY 2846
 KY 2847 KY 2848 (removed 2005) KY 2849 (removed 2005)
 KY 2850 KY 2851 (removed 1991)
 KY 2852
 KY 2853
 KY 2854
 KY 2855
 KY 2856
 KY 2857- KY 2856 near La Grange to Commerce Parkway in La Grange (established 1987)
 KY 2858
 KY 2859
 KY 2860
 KY 2861- KY 148 at Olive Branch to US 60 in Shelbyville (established 1987)
 KY 2862- KY 55 near Shelbyville to US 60 in Shelbyville (established 1987) KY 2863 (removed 2004) KY 2864 (removed 1990) KY 2865 (removed 2016)
 KY 2866- KY 1790 near Hooper to KY 714 near Hemp Ridge (established 1987)
 KY 2867
 KY 2868
 KY 2869
 KY 2870
 KY 2871
 KY 2872- KY 2881 near Richmond to US 25 / US 421 near Richmond
 KY 2873
 KY 2874
 KY 2875
 KY 2876
 KY 2877
 KY 2878
 KY 2879
 KY 2880
 KY 2881 KY 2882 (removed 2011) KY 2883 (removed 2015)
 KY 2884
 KY 2885
 KY 2886 KY 2887 (removed 1989)
 KY 2888 KY 2889 (removed 1989)
 KY 2890 KY 2891 (removed 1989) KY 2892 (removed 1989) KY 2893 (removed 1989) KY 2894 (removed 1989) KY 2895 (removed 1990) KY 2896 (removed 1989)
 KY 2897 KY 2898 (removed 1989) KY 2899 (removed 1993)

2900-2999 KY 2900 (removed 1989) KY 2901 (removed 1990)
 KY 2902 KY 2903 (removed 1989) KY 2904 (removed 1989) KY 2905 (removed 1993)
 KY 2906
 KY 2907
 KY 2908
 KY 2909
 KY 2910 KY 2911 (removed 2009)
 KY 2912
 KY 2913
 KY 2914
 KY 2915 KY 2916 (removed 1980)
 KY 2917
 KY 2918
 KY 2919
 KY 2920
 KY 2921 KY 2922 (removed 1984) KY 2923 (removed 1984)
 KY 2924
 KY 2925
 KY 2926 KY 2927 (removed 1997) KY 2928 (removed 1997)
 KY 2929 KY 2930 (removed 2000) KY 2931 (removed 2000) KY 2932 (removed 1997)
 KY 2933
 KY 2934
 KY 2935
 KY 2936
 KY 2937 KY 2938 (removed 1999) KY 2939 (removed 1992)
 KY 2940 KY 2941 (removed 1995)
 KY 2942 KY 2943- Spur from KY 36 in Williamstown (removed 2021)
 KY 2944- Curry Lane near KY 22 in Dry Ridge
 KY 2945- Spur from KY 1994 near Sherman
 KY 2946- Spur from KY 2945 near Sherman KY 2947 (removed 1991)
 KY 2948
 KY 2949 KY 2950 (removed 1991)
 KY 2951 KY 2952 (removed 2005) KY 2953 (removed 1991) KY 2954 (removed 2005) KY 2955 (removed 1991) KY 2956 (removed 1989) KY 2957 (removed 1993) KY 2958 (removed 1993) KY 2959 (removed 1993) KY 2960 (removed 1995) KY 2961 (removed 2001) KY 2962 (removed 2005) KY 2963 (removed 2005) KY 2964 (removed 2005) KY 2965 (removed 1997) KY 2966 (removed 1997)
 KY 2967
 KY 2968
 KY 2969
 KY 2970
 KY 2971
 KY 2972
 KY 2973 KY 2974 (removed 1980) KY 2975 (removed 2017) KY 2976 (removed 1980) KY 2977 (removed 1985) KY 2978 (removed 2017) KY 2979 (removed 1997) KY 2980 (removed 1994) KY 2981 (removed 1989)
 KY 2982 KY 2983 (removed 1988)
 KY 2984
 KY 2985
 KY 2986
 KY 2987 KY 2988 (removed 1981)
 KY 2989 KY 2990 (removed 1988) KY 2991 (removed 1988) KY 2992 (removed 1988)
 KY 2993
 KY 2994
 KY 2995
 KY 2996
 KY 2997
 KY 2998 KY 2999'' (removed 1988)

See also
List of primary state highways in Kentucky

References

External links
Kentucky Transportation Cabinet - Division of Planning

 2000
State2000